Richard Arnold Shore (born August 18, 1946) is a professor of mathematics at Cornell University who works in recursion theory.

Career 
He was, in 1983, an invited speaker at the International Congress of Mathematicians in Warsaw and gave a talk The Degrees of Unsolvability: the Ordering of Functions by Relative Computability. In 2009, he was the Gödel Lecturer (Reverse mathematics: the playground of logic). He was an editor from 1984 to 1993 of the Journal of Symbolic Logic and from 1993 to 2000 of the Bulletin of Symbolic Logic. In 2012, he became a fellow of the American Mathematical Society.

References

External links
Cornell Math - Richard A. Shore.

Living people
American logicians
Cornell University faculty
Fellows of the American Mathematical Society
20th-century American mathematicians
21st-century American mathematicians
1946 births
Gödel Lecturers